František Ventura (13 August 1894 in Vysoké Mýto – 1 December 1969 in Prague) was a Czech equestrian who competed in the 1928 Summer Olympics.

In 1928, he and his horse Eliot won the gold medal in the individual jumping competition. The Czechoslovak jumping team did not finish the team jumping competition, because one of their riders was disqualified in the individual competition.

References

External links
profile

1894 births
1969 deaths
People from Vysoké Mýto
20th-century Czech people
Czechoslovak male equestrians
Czech male equestrians
Show jumping riders
Olympic equestrians of Czechoslovakia
Equestrians at the 1928 Summer Olympics
Olympic gold medalists for Czechoslovakia
Olympic medalists in equestrian
Medalists at the 1928 Summer Olympics
Sportspeople from the Pardubice Region